McQ is a 1974 American Panavision neo-noir crime action film directed by John Sturges and starring John Wayne. It costars Eddie Albert, Diana Muldaur, and Al Lettieri, and features Colleen Dewhurst, Clu Gulager, David Huddleston, Julian Christopher (credited as Jim Watkins), Roger E. Mosley, and William Bryant in supporting roles. The film was shot in the State of Washington, making extensive use of locations in Seattle and with a sequence near the end filmed on the Pacific Coast at Moclips.

Plot
Before dawn in Seattle, a man drives into town and shoots a policeman on his beat, and another in a parking lot. The gunman leaves his car at a dealership and enters a luncheonette, where, now seen to be wearing a police badge, he is greeted as "Sarge". A car pulls up, and the gunman goes outside. He gives the driver a satchel containing his gun and begins to walk away, but the driver shoots him in the back with a shotgun.

At the marina where he lives on his boat, Detective Lieutenant Lon "McQ" McHugh is awoken by a phone call alerting him to the shooting of his longtime partner, Detective Sergeant Stan Boyle, and the deaths of the two police officers. He scares away a man who is attempting to steal his 1973 Pontiac Firebird Trans Am, only to immediately be shot at by someone else. Returning fire, he kills the assailant, who he recognizes as a professional hitman.

McQ goes to see Boyle at Harborview Medical Center. Boyle is unconscious and in critical condition, but McQ talks with Boyle's wife, Lois, before going to the police station. Although Captain Edward Kosterman believes the shootings are the work of counterculture militants, McQ is convinced local shipping magnate and suspected narcotics dealer Manny Santiago, who is being investigated by McQ and Boyle, is responsible.

Despite a warning from Kosterman to leave the shooting investigation to other detectives, McQ begins tailing Santiago. When he learns Boyle has died, he follows Santiago into a men's room and beats him viciously. Threatened with desk duty, McQ resigns, against the urgings of Franklyn Toms, a field deputy who works as a liaison between the city council and police department.

Continuing to investigate the case through a partnership with local private eye "Pinky" Farrell, McQ learns from Rosey and Myra, two of Boyle's informants, that Santiago has assembled a team to steal the confiscated drugs that are housed in the police department's evidence vault. He follows the drugs when they are taken by representatives from the State Attorney General's Office to be destroyed at a secret location, which, this time, is a hospital. Santiago's team, disguised as employees of the laundry service, steals the drugs, and McQ gives chase, but they get away. Kosterman forces McQ to forfeit his personal revolver, so McQ goes to a gun store and acquires a pistol and a MAC-10 submachine gun.

That night, McQ breaks into Santiago's office, but is caught. Santiago reveals the drugs his team stole turned out to be powdered sugar, the real drugs having been replaced in the evidence vault by corrupt members of the police department, and lets McQ go, though not before paying him back for the earlier beating.

Now suspecting Kosterman may have been responsible for Boyle's death, McQ revisits Boyle's informants and learns there were rumors Boyle was dirty. Then, with him inside, McQ's car is crushed between two semi-trucks. He deduces the unusual attack was intended to separate him from his car, rather than kill him, so he leaves the hospital to inspect his car at the impound lot and discovers the missing drugs hidden inside. Kosterman arrives with backup, saying there was an anonymous tip about the location of the drugs, but McQ manages to escape.

In the morning, McQ knocks on Lois' door. She says she is leaving to visit her parents, and McQ tags along. When they are near the Pacific Ocean, he tells her that he knows Boyle stashed the drugs in his car, and accuses Lois of helping Boyle's accomplice double-cross him. McQ finds the drugs in Lois' suitcase and, when a car begins to follow them, directs her to take a turnoff to the beach. He kills the other driver in the ensuing shootout and discovers the dead man is Toms.

Santiago and his men arrive in two cars, and McQ leads them on a high-speed chase down the beach, followed by a standoff that ends with everyone dead, except for McQ, thanks to his MAC-10, and Lois, who is subsequently locked up. Kosterman gives McQ back his badge and they get a drink at a bar.

Cast

 John Wayne as Detective Lieutenant Lon "McQ" McHugh
 Eddie Albert as Captain Edward Kosterman
 Diana Muldaur as Lois Boyle
 Colleen Dewhurst as Myra
 Clu Gulager as Frank Toms
 David Huddleston as Edward "Pinky" Farrell
 Jim Watkins as J. C.
 Al Lettieri as Manny Santiago
 Julie Adams as Elaine Forrester (formerly McHugh)
 Roger E. Mosley as Rosey
 William Bryant as Sergeant Stan Boyle
 Richard Kelton as Radical
 Richard Eastham as Walter Forrester
 Larry Buck as Chief Grogan (uncredited)
 Kim Sanford as Ginger McHugh (uncredited)

Production
A few years prior to making this film, Wayne had passed on playing the lead in Dirty Harry (1971), a decision he later admitted regretting. Dirty Harry was set in Seattle in one version of the script, but the setting was changed to San Francisco when Clint Eastwood became connected to the project.

McQ was shot in 1973 on location in Seattle, Aberdeen, and the Quinault Indian Reservation in Washington. While filming the beach scenes, the crew stayed at the Polynesian Hotel (The "Poly") in Ocean Shores.

The dramatic car chase in which Wayne, in his character's green 1973 Pontiac Firebird Trans Am "Green Hornet", pursues the laundry van was influenced by Steve McQueen's chase scene in Bullitt (1968).

When preparing to flip the car during the beach chase without using ramps, stunt driver Hal Needham performed the very first car stunt using a black powder cannon charge. On the second practice run down in Los Angeles, the car was unknowingly overcharged, and Needham was nearly killed. Gary McLarty performed the stunt on the beach that is featured in the film.

One of Wayne's famous lines from this film is delivered as his character is being rescued from his car after it has been crushed between two semi-trucks with him trapped inside. He says to one of the reporting officers, "I'm up to my butt in gas."

Novelization
A novelization of the film, written by Alexander Edwards, was published in 1974 by Warner Books. The novel was written before production began on the film, and there are subtle differences, such as McQ living in an apartment, rather than on a boat, was an ex Navy combat operator and using a Mauser in the climax, rather than a (grander) MAC-10 submachine gun. Some scenes are also deleted or modified, but, on the whole, the book is fairly true to the movie in both dialogue and plot.

Reception
In a contemporary review, Arthur D. Murphy of Variety called the film "a good contemporary crime actioner" that was "extremely well cast. Coproducer Lawrence Roman's script has some good twists, turns and ironies, caught well by director John Sturges." Kevin Thomas of the Los Angeles Times compared McQ favorably to the recent Magnum Force (the sequel to Dirty Harry): "The most intriguing aspect of John Wayne's diverting but undistinguished new picture 'McQ' at selected theaters is its similarity to Clint Eastwood's 'Magnum Force' ... The difference—and it may be crucial—is that Wayne, blustering and bombastic as ever, dominates his film whereas it's violence for violence's sake that takes over 'Magnum Force.' Eastwood's film looks lots more chic, but 'McQ' has lots more humanity." Gene Siskel of the Chicago Tribune gave the film two-and-a-half stars out of four and wrote: "Like so many of his recent movies, 'McQ' would be nothing without Wayne. In fact, less than nothing, because tho its story takes a high number of unexpected turns, the pacing is excruciatingly slow, its supporting characters excruciatingly vapid. And yet the film holds together around Wayne." Pauline Kael also criticized the pace, dismissing the film as "prostratingly dull", as did Nora Sayre of The New York Times, who wrote: "In this wildly undramatic picture, music and gunshots have to provide the gumption that the acting lacks. Surely Mr. Wayne should stick to Westerns: he's simply too slow to play any kind of policeman. Horseless in the streets of Seattle, he looks as though he needs a shot of sand." Gary Arnold of The Washington Post wrote: "'McQ' can be recommended if you're in the mood for a commercial movie so stiff and perfunctory that it becomes unintentionally funny ... Wayne really should have enough savvy to realize that he looks ridiculous speeding around town in a green Hornet. This sporty image doesn't do anything for him anymore than his toupee does."

Retrospectively, James M. Tate of Cult Film Freaks said the movie has a film noir quality: "Director John Sturges was, like Wayne, best known for making Westerns, a genre McQ borrows from with the maverick loner versus an eclectic string of feisty (and often sneaky) antagonists, each with their own lethal agenda, sometimes even coming out of the woodwork with guns blazing.
But with the cool looking MAC-10 submachine gun and a snaky trail pitting one man against shadowy odds, this is really a modern Noir thriller providing a chance to see the American icon grittier, and often more vulnerable, than ever before: at least in a modern setting."

On review aggregator website Rotten Tomatoes, the film has an approval rating of 44% based on 9 reviews, with an average score of 5.50/10.

See also
 John Wayne filmography
 List of American films of 1974
 Brannigan

Notes

References

External links

 
 
 
 
 
 

1974 films
1970s crime action films
American crime action films
Batjac Productions films
Fictional portrayals of the Seattle Police Department
Films about the illegal drug trade
Films directed by John Sturges
Films produced by John Wayne
Films scored by Elmer Bernstein
Films set in Seattle
Films shot in Washington (state)
American police detective films
Warner Bros. films
1970s English-language films
1970s American films